Zachary Wolfe Galligan (born February 14, 1964) is an American actor. He is best known for starring as Billy Peltzer in the comedy-horror films Gremlins (1984) and Gremlins 2: The New Batch (1990).

Early life and education
Galligan was born on February 14, 1964, in New York City, the son of Carol Jean (née Wolfe), a psychologist, and Arthur John Galligan, a lawyer who was a founding partner of the law firm of Dickstein Shapiro. He has a sister, Jessica, and graduated from Columbia University.

Career

Galligan's first major and most widely seen role was as Billy Peltzer in the 1984 film Gremlins. Prior to being cast in Gremlins, he filmed Nothing Lasts Forever, which had its theatrical release cancelled and went unreleased in any form for years. In 1988, he starred as Mark Loftmore in the horror comedy Waxwork. He reprised his role as Billy in the 1990 sequel Gremlins 2: The New Batch, and returned to the role of Mark for Waxwork II: Lost in Time.

In 2016, UK progressive rock band Gandalf's Fist announced that Galligan would voice a character on their album The Clockwork Fable.

In early 2021, Galligan appeared in a Mountain Dew commercial in which his Gremlins character, Billy, gives Gizmo a drink of his Mountain Dew. Galligan is set to return to the Gremlins franchise again in the upcoming animated series Gremlins: Secrets of the Mogwai.

Personal life 
Galligan married Ling-Ling Hu Ingerick at the Yale Club in New York on September 25, 2005; they divorced in 2010. In 2003, Galligan was arrested for allegedly shoplifting a CD from a Los Angeles Tower Records store.

Filmography

Film

Television

Web

References

External links

Zach Galligan's Blog

1964 births
Living people
20th-century American male actors
21st-century American male actors
American male film actors
American male television actors
Collegiate School (New York) alumni
Columbia University alumni
Male actors from New York City